Ellia Smeding (born 16 March 1998) is a British long track speed skater. She competed at the 2020 European Speed Skating Championships in Heerenveen, Netherlands. Racing in the 1000 meters, 1500 meters, and mass start events, she placed 14th, 18th, and 16th respectively. She participated in the 2022 Winter Olympics in Beijing, becoming the first female long track speed skater to represent Great Britain at the Olympics since 1980.

She holds personal bests of 1:15.12 in the 1000 meters and 1:57.62 in the 1500 meters.

Personal life 
Born in Aylesbury in Buckinghamshire, England, Smeding spent her early childhood in Oxfordshire before her family relocated to Leeuwarden in the Netherlands when she was around eight years old (her father is Dutch and her mother, English). She is in a relationship with fellow British-Dutch Olympic speed skater ; based in Heerenveen, the couple have a coffee brewing business which helps to fund their sporting lives.

References

External links 
 
Ellia Smeding at ISU

1998 births
Living people
British female speed skaters
Speed skaters at the 2022 Winter Olympics
Olympic speed skaters of Great Britain
British people of Dutch descent
Sportspeople from Aylesbury
Sportspeople from Oxfordshire
English emigrants to the Netherlands
Sportspeople from Leeuwarden